Father and Daughter is a 2000 Dutch animated short film written and directed by Michaël Dudok de Wit. It won the Academy Award for Best Animated Short Film in 2001.

Plot
A father says goodbye to his young daughter and leaves. As the wide Dutch landscapes live through their seasons so the girl lives through hers. She becomes a young woman, has a family and in time she becomes old, yet within her there is always a deep longing for her father. At the end of the film, in what appears to be a dream sequence, or perhaps the afterlife, they are reunited.

Awards 
The film received over 20 awards and 1 nomination and is considered the most successful in the series of works by Dudok de Wit. It was also included in the Animation Show of Shows.

 BAFTA Award for Best Short Animation (25 February 2001)
 Academy Award for Best Animated Short Film (25 March 2001)
 Grand Prix at World Festival of Animated Film - Animafest Zagreb in 2002.

See also
2000 in film
Animation Show of Shows

References

External links
 
 
 
 Father and Daughter at Keyframe

2000 films
2000 animated films
2000s animated short films
BAFTA winners (films)
Best Animated Short Academy Award winners
Dutch animated short films
Films scored by Normand Roger
Films directed by Michaël Dudok de Wit
Animated films without speech
British animated short films
2000s British films